The 1972–73 Sussex County Football League season was the 48th in the history of Sussex County Football League a football competition in England.

Division One

Division One featured 13 clubs which competed in the division last season, along with two new clubs, promoted from Division Two:
Newhaven
Sidley United

League table

Division Two

Division Two featured twelve clubs which competed in the division last season, along with one new club, relegated from Division One:
Lancing

League table

References

1972-73
9